This is a list of squads that was picked at the 1975 Cricket World Cup which took place in England between 7 and 21 June 1975. All eight teams had to select a 14-member squad before the World Cup started. The oldest player at the 1975 Cricket World Cup was Don Pringle (41) of East Africa while the youngest player was  Javed Miandad (17/18) of Pakistan.

Manager:  F.W. Bennett

Source: Cricinfo 1975 World Cup stats for Australia
Source: The Canberra Times

East Africa
Manager:  Jasmer Singh Grewal

Source: Cricinfo 1975 World Cup stats for East Africa

Source: Records: 1975 Prudential World Cup England Stats

Manager:  Gulabrai Ramchand

Source: Cricinfo 1975 World Cup stats for India

Source: Cricinfo 1975 World Cup stats for New Zealand

Source: Cricinfo 1975 World Cup stats for Pakistan

Manager:  K.M.T.Perera

Source: Cricinfo 1975 World Cup stats for Sri Lanka

Manager:  Clyde Walcott

Source: Cricinfo 1975 World Cup stats for West Indies

External links
1975 Cricket World Cup. Cricinfo.com.

Cricket World Cup squads
Squads, 1975 Cricket World Cup